Carleton Place is a town in Eastern Ontario, Canada, in Lanark County, about  west of downtown Ottawa. It is located at the crossroads of Highway 15 and Highway 7, halfway between the towns of Perth, Almonte, Smiths Falls, and the nation's capital, Ottawa. Canada's Mississippi River, a tributary of the Ottawa River flows through the town.  Mississippi Lake is just upstream by boat, as well as by car.

History

The town is situated on the edge of a large limestone plain, just south of the edge of the Canadian Shield in the deciduous forest ecoregion of North America. Carleton Place was first settled by Europeans when British authorities prompted immigration to Lanark County in the early 19th century. The Morphy and Moore families were among the first to arrive. Edmond Morphy chose the site in 1819 when he realized there was potential in the area's waterfall. He built a mill there and was the first of many such textile and lumber industries to locate in the area. The settlement was then known as Morphy's Falls. In 1829, the area was renamed Carleton Place, after a street in Glasgow, Scotland, when a post office was constructed. It became a village in 1870, and a town in 1890.  The community's economic growth was enabled by the construction of the Brockville and Ottawa Railway later in the century. The town was also renowned for its access to Mississippi Lake, and had steamship service to Innisville on the west end of Mississippi Lake between the 1860s and 1920s.

Moore House
170 Bridge Street 
Constructed in the mid-19th century, Moore House originally sat at the north end of Moore street, opposite Lansdowne Avenue.
In 2007 the building was moved to its current location, 170 Bridge St. Today, the Moore house is home to the Carleton Place Chamber of Commerce and Visitor and Information Center. Moore House served as a home to multiple generations of the Moore family, including Ida Moore, who lived there with her parents and her four siblings.
 
The Hauntings of the Moore House
In 1900, at age 21, Ida died from tuberculosis in the home, and many believe her spirit has haunted the building ever since.
Some of Ida's antics allegedly include moving objects, opening and closing windows, turning radios off and on, and staring out windows.
A paranormal investigation was conducted at Moore House in July 2017, by Ottawa Paranormal Research and Investigations and released in the web series, Into the Haunting.

Industry
The logging industry stimulated economic development in the 19th century, with white pine logs exported to Europe. Local forests were depleted of hemlock to provide bark for the leather tanning industry. Both textile and lumber mills flourished, but none still operates. "The Findlay Foundry", founded by David Findlay in 1862, operated until 1974, making cast-iron cookware and woodstoves. Some of the designs created by this company are still being made by another company. Today, the remaining mill buildings house condominiums and high-tech industry. The "Crash Position Indicator" (CPI) was manufactured and marketed in Carleton Place by Leigh Instruments Ltd.

Demographics

Statistics Canada cited Carleton Place as the fastest growing municipality in Canada in 2021.

Notable residents
 Roy Brown, RAF pilot credited with shooting down the Red Baron
 D'Alton Corry Coleman, president of the Canadian Pacific Railway
 David Cooney, Juno Award-winning folk-rock musician, a founding member of the band Waltons
 Ryan Cuthbert, sprint kayaker, 2 time Olympian (2004 Sydney Olympics(k-4 1000m), 2008 Beijing Olympics(k-2 1000m))
 Shean Donovan, professional ice hockey player (retired), who last played for the Ottawa Senators.
 John Edwards, sprint canoer, Olympian (1976 Montreal Olympics)
 Jill Heinerth, cave diver and explorer
 Eddie MacCabe, sports editor of the Ottawa Journal and the Ottawa Citizen
 Leslie McFarlane, wrote many of the original Hardy Boys books under the pen name Franklin W. Dixon
 Jordan McIntosh, pop-country musician, 2014 Country Music Association of Ontario Rising Star Award Recipient and 2015 Canadian Country Music Association Rising Star Award Nominee
 Bat Phillips, professional ice hockey player for the Montreal Maroons
 Andrew Willows, sprint kayaker, 2 time Olympian, (2004 Sydney Olympics(k-4 1000m), 2008 Beijing Olympics(k-2 500m))

Schools
The Upper Canada District School Board manages public education in Carleton Place and Lanark County, while the Catholic District School Board of Eastern Ontario is in charge of schools teaching the Catholic curriculum.  Schools in the Carleton Place area include:

 Carleton Place High School
 Notre Dame Catholic High School

Sister cities
Carleton Place is an active participant in the Sister Cities program and has a relationship with the following municipalities:

Franklin, Tennessee, United States (2008)
Comrie, Scotland, United Kingdom

See also

 Carleton Place Airport
 Mississippi River
 Mississippi Lake
 List of towns in Ontario
 List of population centres in Ontario
 Carleton Place Canadians
 Carleton Place Jr. Canadians

Sources
Statistics Canada 2006 Community Profile – Carleton Place retrieved 2007-11-02
Local History retrieved 2011/06/09
Step forward for condos and farmers market as demolition begins retrieved 2011/06/09
Death knell for Ottawa Valley rail line retrieved 2011/06/09

References

External links

 
Lower-tier municipalities in Ontario
Towns in Ontario